The 7" Singles Box Set is a box set by Paul McCartney released in December 2022 containing 80 seven-inch vinyl singles originally released between 1971 and 2022. The box set was packaged in a wooden crate manufactured in the United Kingdom and limited to only 3000 units worldwide. The box set sold out upon announcement by McCartney. It was also made available on various digital platforms.

Background
The box set was announced building upon an eventful 2022 for Paul McCartney, from the Got Back tour in late spring, his eightieth birthday on 18 June, his headlining the Glastonbury Festival a week later on 25 June, and the 5 August release of McCartney I II III, another box set collection bringing together the "McCartney trilogy" in McCartney, McCartney II, and McCartney III. With the announcement, mono versions of "Uncle Albert/Admiral Halsey" and "Too Many People" from Ram were released as single tracks on digital platforms.

An introduction for the box set was written by longtime Rolling Stone editor Rob Sheffield and published ahead of its release on Paul McCartney's website. In the introduction, Sheffield celebrated and complimented the box set and its capability to tell McCartney's biography: "The 7" Singles Box tells McCartney’s life story in 80 vinyl singles, right after his 80th birthday. It starts with "Another Day" from 1971, his first 45 after the Beatles. It carries through his one-of-a-kind career, from Wings up to McCartney III. These singles add up to a sprawling saga—an epic, really. It's no ordinary way to tell the story of a life, but then, this is no ordinary life."

Track listing 
The box set includes 163 tracks across the 80 seven-inch vinyl singles, while a digital counterpart includes only 159 tracks (removing duplicates or re-releases noted in the following track listing).

Charts

References 

2022 albums
Paul McCartney albums
Compilation albums by British artists